Latvia national speedway team is the national speedway team which represents Latvia.

Speedway World Cup

National speedway teams
Speedway
!